Alessandro Rinaldi (born 23 November 1974) is a retired Italian footballer who played as a defender.

Club career
Rinaldi began his career at U.S. Consalvo, a small team from the Quadraro district in Rome, before moving first to Lodigiani and then to S.S. Lazio. He never played for Lazio in the Serie A. In 1993, he was transferred to the Serie C1 team in Nola where he caught the attention of scouts for Hellas Verona F.C., for whom he played in the 1994–95 season in the Italian Serie B. He then moved to Ravenna Calcio, where he became a first-choice player and with whom he played for three seasons, and then to Bologna F.C. 1909 in 1998. In 1999, he moved to A.S. Roma, where he won the league championship in 2001.

He went to Roma along with Francesco Antonioli and Amedeo Mangone, which priced Rinaldi for 6 (short) billion Italian lire, Antonioli 10 billion lire  and Mangone 13 billion lire respectively. This was originally intended to be a swap deal for Antonio Chimenti and Ivan Tomić, however this failed. Instead, Pierre Womé joined Bologna.

In the 2001–02 season he was sold to Atalanta B.C. for 6 billion Italian lire, and concurrently as part of this deal Ivan Pelizzoli joined Roma for 33 billion lire.

As part of Paolo Foglio's deal, he moved to Chievo in January 2002.

International career
Rinaldi played for Italy at the 1991 FIFA U-17 World Championship in Italy.

Honours
Bologna
 UEFA Intertoto Cup: 1998

Roma
 Serie A champion: 2000–01

References

External links
 
 Profile at FIGC 

1974 births
Living people
Footballers from Rome
Italian footballers
Italy youth international footballers
Serie A players
Serie B players
Serie C players
Hellas Verona F.C. players
Ravenna F.C. players
Bologna F.C. 1909 players
A.S. Roma players
Atalanta B.C. players
A.C. ChievoVerona players
Piacenza Calcio 1919 players
U.S. Triestina Calcio 1918 players
Association football defenders